Barasat is a city in India. It may also refer to:

Barasat Sadar subdivision, an administrative division in North 24 Parganas district in the Indian state of West Bengal
Barasat I, a community development block in North 24 Parganas district in the Indian state of West Bengal
Barasat II, a community development block in North 24 Parganas district in the Indian state of West Bengal
Barasat (Lok Sabha constituency), a parliamentary constituency in North 24 Parganas district in the Indian state of West Bengal
Barasat (Vidhan Sabha constituency), an assembly constituency in North 24 Parganas district in the Indian state of West Bengal
Barasat Junction railway station
Barasat Peary Charan Sarkar Government High School
Barasat College
Barasat Government College